Donkeys 92–97 is a compilation album by the British alternative band Tindersticks, released in August 1998. The album is a collection of singles, B-sides, rarities, and unreleased recordings. The band had signed to the major label Island Records after their previous independent label, This Way Up, had folded, and Donkeys 92–97 was intended to be an introduction by Island for new listeners. The  vinyl version of the album was limited to 5,000 copies and contained an extra track, "Feeling Relatively Good".

Track listing

Vinyl LP bonus track

References 

Tindersticks albums
1998 compilation albums